Second Age Theatre Company existed to promote an awareness and love of classical theatre for all, but especially young people and new audiences for Shakespeare.

History of the company
Second Age Theatre Company was established in 1989 by Alan Stanford, Ronan Smith, Brian O'Donoghue and Martin Drury as a response to the demand from Second Level schools for a dedicated production company to present curriculum based texts, especially those of William Shakespeare. At that time, ad hoc productions were occasionally staged but of an uneven quality and at irregular intervals. It was felt by the company founders that something more permanent was required and offering a more complete package to the students. Thereafter Second Age offered regular productions of the major texts for study and in a time frame suited to the study programme of the schools. Second Age focused on producing Shakespeare and contemporary Irish classics for young audiences with particular emphasis on the plays being studied by Second Level Leaving Certificate students. As well as performing in Dublin, the company toured throughout Ireland at least once a year. Between 1989 and 2013 well over half a million second level students gained their first experience of serious professional theatre and of Shakespeare at a Second Age production. In addition, the company built a considerable following among theatre audiences for its productions and was a regular feature of the Irish theatre circuit.

Productions

Shakespeare repertoire	

The writer at the heart of Second Age's repertoire was always Shakespeare. The company’s primary production in January/February was always the play set for study in fifth year for senior cycle studies. This tended to work on a four-year cycle of Hamlet, King Lear, Macbeth and Othello. In addition the company has presented at various times, productions of Romeo and Juliet, As You Like It and The Merchant of Venice. Each time the cycle is re-visited a brand new production is created for that year.

Other plays
Other plays on the Leaving Certificate syllabus were also staged when time and resources permitted, and included, The Plough and the Stars, The Playboy of the Western World, Philadelphia, Here I Come! and How Many Miles to Babylon.

Performance History
As You Like It: 1989
Othello: 1990
Macbeth: 1990
Playboy of the Western World: 1991
Hamlet: 1991
King Lear: 1992
The Plough and the Stars: 1993
Othello: 1993
The Merchant of Venice: 1994
Macbeth: 1994
Hamlet: 1995
The Field: 1996
King Lear: 1996
The Merchant of Venice: 1997
Othello: 1997
Romeo and Juiliet: 1998
Macbeth: 1998
Hamlet: 1999
King Lear: 2001
Macbeth: 2002
Romeo and Juilet: 2002
Macbeth: 2003
Hamlet: 2004
King Lear: 2005
How Many Miles to Babylon?: 2006
Macbeth: 2006
How Many Miles to Babylon?: 2006
Othello: 2007
Philadelphia, Here I Come!: 2007
Macbeth: 2008
King Lear: 2009
Hamlet: 2010
Dancing at Lughnasa: 2010
Hamlet: 2011
Macbeth: 2012
Romeo and Juliet: 2013
Othello: 2013

External links
 https://web.archive.org/web/20110721130445/http://www.secondage.ie/

Theatre companies in the Republic of Ireland